is the Japanese word for dream, and may refer to:

People
, Japanese rugby sevens player
, Japanese actress
, Japanese rugby sevens player
, Japanese gravure idol and actress 
, Japanese professional footballer

Entertainment
YuMe, a multi-screen video advertising platform
Dreams (1990 film), a film by the Japanese director Akira Kurosawa
"Yume" (Miwako Okuda song), a single released by Japanese singer Miwako Okuda
"Yume" (The Blue Hearts song), a 1992 song by The Blue Hearts

Characters
Yume, a character in the Japanese manga Tenchi Muyo!
Yume Hasegawa, a character in the Japanese manga Pupa
Yume Suzuhara, a character in the Japanese manga Hōzuki Island and Mōryō no Yurikago
Yume Nijino, a character in an anime show Aikatsu Stars!

Places
 Yume, Tibet, a township in Tibet
 Yume Chu, a tributary of Subansiri River in Tibet
Yume Anime Bar, an anime themed, Japan inspired, night bar in Brno, Czech Republic

See also
Hana to Yume, a shōjo manga magazine
Nagai Yume, a Japanese television drama show
Yume Bitsu, an American psychedelic rock band
Yume Nikki, a 2005 independent video game by homebrew Japanese developer Kikiyama
Yume Tsukai, a 2001 Japanese manga and anime series
"Yume wa Yoru Hiraku", a 1970 Japanese song

Japanese feminine given names